Linda Mathews Watkins (May 23, 1908 – October 31, 1976) was an American stage, film, and television actress.

Early years 
Born in Boston, Massachusetts, Watkins was the daughter of Gardiner and Elizabeth R. (née Mathews) Watkins. Her father was active in real estate in Boston. She was related to physicist Albert A. Michelson and painter Arthur Radclyffe Dugmore.

Watkins attended a teachers' college because her parents wanted her to teach. She later went to study at the Theatre Guild.

Career

Stage

After six months Watkins began to appear with the Theater Guild's summer repertory program in Scarborough, New York. Three weeks after she finished a course at the Theater Guild's Dramatic School, she had the lead in The Devil in the Cheese. When producer Charles Hopkins asked Watkins if she preferred playing comedy or drama, she replied, "Tragedy". He was casting for a comedy production and Watkins was offered the lead role.

Watkins gained additional acting experience during a season with the Hartman stock theater company in Columbus, Ohio, after which the Shubert Organization gave her the lead in its Chicago production of Trapped.

Aged 17, she performed in the Tom Cushing comedy The Devil In The Cheese with Fredric March at the Charles Hopkins Theater in New York City. In 1928, she appeared in the Forest Theater production of Trapped by Samuel Shipman. She appeared in a revival of The Wild Duck in November 1928, starred in the George S. Kaufman/Ring Lardner comedy June Moon in 1929, and co-starred with Ralph Morgan in Sweet Stranger in 1930.

Film

She debuted in movies in Sob Sister (1931), a film in which she plays a female reporter. Reviewer Muriel Babcock remarked that Watkins "is cool, blond, poised, good to look upon. She plays the title role with admirable restraint and gives every evidence of being a comer in films."

Her second movie was Good Sport (1931), a screen adaptation of a story by William J. Hurlbut. Produced by the Fox Film Company, Watkins played Marilyn Parker, a naive wife caught up in a love triangle. Her co-stars were Alan Dinehart and John Boles. She appeared in Charlie Chan's Chance, a lost 1932 film starring Warner Oland as the famous detective. Edmund Lowe and Watkins co-starred in Cheaters at Play (1932).

Her other film credits included From Hell It Came (1957), Ten North Frederick (1958), As Young as We Are (1958), Cash McCall (1960), Because They're Young (1960), The Parent Trap (1961), Good Neighbor Sam (1964), Huckleberry Finn (1974) and Bad Ronald (1974).

Television
Watkins appeared in numerous television broadcasts beginning in 1950 with an episode of The Billy Rose Show. Other television shows appearances include The Adventures of Jim Bowie, Alfred Hitchcock Presents, The Asphalt Jungle,Bonanza, The David Niven Show, Death Valley Days, The Doris Day Show, Gunsmoke,  Hazel, How to Marry a Millionaire, Ichabod and Me, The Investigators, M Squad, McMillan & Wife, The Munsters,  Perry Mason, Peter Gunn,  and Wagon Train.

One of her last television roles as a guest star was as Maggie MacKenzie in The Waltons in the episode "The Journey" (1973).

Personal life

Marriage
Watkins married lawyer Gabriel L. Hess, a widower, at the Blackstone Hotel in Chicago on January 28, 1932.

Death
Watkins died in Los Angeles in 1976, aged 68, from undisclosed causes.

Filmography

Film

Television

References

Sources
Fresno Bee, "Linda Watkins Hinted To Be A Bride", January 27, 1932, pg.  5.
Los Angeles Times, "Baby Stars Vote Splits Up WAMPAS", August 15, 1931, pg. A1.
Los Angeles Times, "New Move Marks War On Wampas", August 24, 1931, pg. A1.
Los Angeles Times, "Studios Place Stars Together", August 29, 1931, pg. 11.
Los Angeles Times, "Sob Sister Proffered At Loews", October 23, 1931, pg. A11.
New York Times, "A New Ingenue", January 9, 1927, pg. X4.
New York Times, "Trapped To Open Aug. 7", July 25, 1928, pg. 13.
New York Times, "In Sweet Stranger Cast", August 28, 1930, pg. 27.
New York Times, "The Screen", December 12, 1931, pg. 23.
New York Times, "Linda Watkins Weds G.L. Hess In Chicago", January 29, 1932, pg. 12.
Zanesville Register, "Along Broadway", Monday, May 4, 1959, pg. 5.

External links
 

1908 births
1976 deaths
American film actresses
American stage actresses
American television actresses
Actresses from Boston
20th-century American actresses